The Falls Auto Group Classic was an annual golf tournament for professional women golfers on the Futures Tour, the LPGA Tour's developmental tour. The event was played from 2008 to 2010 in the London, Kentucky area.

The tournament is a 54-hole event, as are most Futures Tour events.

Winners

Tournament records

Former Symetra Tour events
Golf in Kentucky
Recurring sporting events established in 2008
Recurring sporting events disestablished in 2010
2008 establishments in Kentucky
2010 disestablishments in Kentucky
London, Kentucky